Liga ASOBAL 1990–91 was the first season of Liga ASOBAL. ASOBAL's governing body was established on May 18, 1990. The league was played in a two phases. In the first phase, a total of 16 teams were separate in two groups of eight teams. The first five of every groups passed to the second phase for the title. The last three passed to the second phase for the permanence in Liga ASOBAL.

First phase

Group A

Group B

Second phase

Group I

Group II

In–Out promotion

1st leg

2nd leg

Tenerife 3 de Mayo & Michelin Valladolid remained in Liga ASOBAL.

Top goal scorers
:

References

1990-91
handball
handball
Spain